The Hollow Hope: Can Courts Bring About Social Change? was written by Gerald N. Rosenberg and published in 1991. A highly controversial work, it produced labels ranging from "revolutionary" to "insulting." A Second Edition of the book was published in 2008 by the University of Chicago Press.

Basic thesis and controversy
In his book, Gerald Rosenberg questions the validity of the commonly accepted axiom that the Supreme Court of the United States is able to affect widespread social change. Naturally, such a drastic departure from conventional beliefs drew the ire of many critics, both within and beyond academia.

Dynamic Court and Constrained Court
Rosenberg examines two views of the United States Supreme Court: the view of the Dynamic Court and the view of the Constrained Court. The Dynamic Court view maintains that the United States Supreme Court is indeed capable of affecting widespread change, often citing cases such as Brown v. Board and Roe v. Wade as examples. The Constrained Court view, on the other hand, holds that because of the existing constraints imposed upon the Court by the United States Constitution and the United States Congress, the Court is unable to accomplish significant change.

Rosenberg sides largely with the Constrained Court view. He studies several landmark cases that have been handed down from the Court, such as Brown v. Board of Education of Topeka (1954) and Roe v. Wade (1973), and asserts that in each examined situation, the Court was largely unable to attain any tangible, empirically-measurable change. Rosenberg names three constraints that preclude the US Supreme Court from being truly effective, and arrives at the conclusion that although the Court is indeed capable of accomplishing significant change, such change can only occur when these three constraints are overcome.

First Constraint
The First Constraint is that the nature of constitutional rights precludes the Court from hearing or effectively acting on many significant social reform claims and lessens the chances of popular mobilization. This Constraint can be overcome if there exists sufficient precedent for change based on the Judiciary's interpretation of the Constitution.

Second Constraint
The Second Constraint is that the Court does not have sufficient independence from the legislative and executive branches to affect significant social reform. This Constraint can be overcome by securing support from substantial numbers in Congress and securing the support of the executive branch.

Third Constraint
The Third Constraint is that the Court does not have the power to develop necessary policy and implement decisions that could affect significant reform. Because, as Alexander Hamilton put it, the Court controls neither the sword (Executive branch) nor the purse (Legislative branch), it must rely on cooperation from the other two branches in order to enforce its decisions. This Constraint can be overcome either by securing support of citizens or at least not having significant opposition from all citizens.

Empirical studies
Rosenberg maintains that the efforts made by women's rights, pro-choice, and civil rights activists to use the courts to produce social change have not been very effective. To prove and support this claim, he examines a great deal of statistical information. In looking at the effects that Brown v. Board had on desegregation, for example, Rosenberg looks at the percentage of black schoolchildren attending mixed schools in the South in the years preceding this landmark decision, and the years following it. He finds that almost no measurable change had occurred in the ten years following this decision. Indeed, it is not until the Civil Rights Act of 1964 that the percentage begins to increase annually. Similarly, in looking at Roe v. Wade, he finds that the annual number of legal abortions did not seem to be greatly affected by the Court's decision.

Criticism
There is a great deal of criticism leveled at The Hollow Hope. Critics maintain that Rosenberg's argument ignores the implications of court decisions on future actions that created more direct change. Critics see similar omissions in discussion of Martin Luther King Jr., who cited Brown v. Board as a reason for mobilizing his followers in a speech given on a night preceding a boycott.

Conceding that Rosenberg presents a provocative if flawed argument against the conventional wisdom that the United States Supreme Court is a powerful judicial body capable of introducing significant change, these same critics maintain that Rosenberg relies on faulty assumptions, such as the duality of man.

See also
 judicial activism
 regulation through litigation

References

External links
A book review in JSTOR  The American Political Science Review, Vol. 86, No. 3 (Sep., 1992), pp. 812–813.

1991 non-fiction books
Law books